Ross Johnston (born February 18, 1994) is a Canadian professional ice hockey forward for the  New York Islanders of the National Hockey League (NHL).

Playing career
The undrafted Johnston played junior hockey in the Quebec Major Junior Hockey League (QMJHL). On March 31, 2015, Johnston was signed to a three-year entry-level contract with the New York Islanders.

At the end of the 2015–16 season, his first professional year, Johnston was recalled by the Islanders and made his NHL debut, going scoreless, on April 10, 2016.

Johnston started the 2017–18 season with the Bridgeport Sound Tigers, but was recalled on January 19, 2018, to replace the injured Casey Cizikas. He recorded his first NHL point in a 7–3 win against the Chicago Blackhawks. He recorded his first NHL goal on January 25, 2018, against the Vegas Golden Knights to help the Islanders win 2–1. He finished the season appearing in 24 games with the Islanders for 3 goals and 6 points.

As a restricted free agent, Johnston agreed to a four-year contract extension with the Islanders on July 9, 2018. On October 26, 2021, Johnston signed a four-year contract extension with the Islanders.

Personal life
Johnston was raised on his family's beef farm in Suffolk, Prince Edward Island. He has one older brother, Will.

Career statistics

References

External links
 

1994 births
Living people
Bridgeport Sound Tigers players
Canadian ice hockey left wingers
Charlottetown Islanders players
Ice hockey people from Prince Edward Island
Missouri Mavericks players
Moncton Wildcats players
New York Islanders players
Sportspeople from Charlottetown
Undrafted National Hockey League players
Victoriaville Tigres players